Anna Verouli (born November 13, 1956) is a retired Greek javelin thrower. She was born in Kavala.

She won the gold medal at the 1982 European Athletics Championships, and a bronze medal at the 1983 World Championships in Athletics.

Verouli was tested positive for nandrolone at the 1984 Summer Olympics and was banned from the competition.

She was married to weightlifter Ioannis Tsintsaris.

Honours

See also
 List of doping cases in athletics

References

External links
 

1956 births
Living people
Sportspeople from Kavala
Greek female javelin throwers
Athletes (track and field) at the 1984 Summer Olympics
Athletes (track and field) at the 1988 Summer Olympics
Athletes (track and field) at the 1992 Summer Olympics
Olympic athletes of Greece
Doping cases in athletics
Greek sportspeople in doping cases
World Athletics Championships medalists
Greek European Athletics champions (track and field)
Mediterranean Games gold medalists for Greece
Mediterranean Games silver medalists for Greece
Mediterranean Games medalists in athletics
Athletes (track and field) at the 1983 Mediterranean Games
Athletes (track and field) at the 1987 Mediterranean Games
Athletes (track and field) at the 1991 Mediterranean Games